Christine Lyn Taylor (born January 13, 1968) is an American judge and former politician from Wisconsin. Taylor is currently a judge of the Dane County Circuit Court, serving since 2020, and previously served as a Democratic member of the Wisconsin State Assembly from 2011 to 2020. Taylor is currently a candidate for a Wisconsin Court of Appeals judgeship based in Madison.

Background 
Taylor and her older sister were raised by her parents in Southern California. She graduated from Birmingham High School in Van Nuys, California, and received her bachelor's degree from the University of Pennsylvania in 1990.  She then attended the University of Wisconsin Law School, earning her J.D. in 1995. She remained in Wisconsin, was admitted to the State Bar of Wisconsin, and worked as a private practice attorney in Milwaukee and Madison from 1996 to 2002. She then became the public policy director for Planned Parenthood of Wisconsin.

Wisconsin state legislature 
In 2011 a vacancy occurred in the Wisconsin State Assembly due to the resignation of Joe Parisi, who had been elected to serve as Dane County Executive.  Taylor had not held any public office before, but topped the crowded six-person Democratic primary with 31% of the vote. She faced no Republican opponent in the general election, and won 5,459 votes; there were 591 write-in votes against her.

The heavily Democratic 48th District included parts of the east and far east sides of Madison, parts of Monona and McFarland and the towns of Blooming Grove and Dunn. But this would be the final year for these district boundaries, as new districts had already been passed by the Republican Legislature.  In 2012, she would run for re-election in the redrawn 76th district, which contained parts of downtown Madison and northeast Madison—including the Wisconsin State Capitol.

In 2017, after Representative Peter Barca announced he would step down from his role as Democratic minority leader in the Assembly, Taylor was considered a strong candidate to replace him.  However, she supported Gordon Hintz for the role and was appointed to the budget-writing Joint Finance Committee shortly thereafter.  In addition to Joint Finance, Taylor currently serves on the Joint Legislative Council and the Assembly committees on Federalism and Interstate Relations, on Finance, and on Public Benefit Reform.

Taylor was re-elected in 2012, 2014, 2016, and 2018, but only faced an opponent in 2016, when she won 83% of the vote.  On March 26, 2020, Taylor announced she would not be a candidate for re-election in 2020.

Wisconsin circuit court

On June 11, 2020, Wisconsin Governor Tony Evers announced he was appointing Taylor to the Wisconsin circuit court in Dane County.  Taylor replaced Judge Jill Karofsky, who had been elected to the Wisconsin Supreme Court in the April 2020 General Election.  Taylor was subsequently elected to a full term as judge in the April 2021 election.

Electoral history

Wisconsin Assembly (2011)

| colspan="6" style="text-align:center;background-color: #e9e9e9;"| Special Democratic Primary, July 12, 2011

| colspan="6" style="text-align:center;background-color: #e9e9e9;"| Special Election, August 9, 2011

Wisconsin Assembly (2016)

| colspan="6" style="text-align:center;background-color: #e9e9e9;"| General Election, November 8, 2016

References

External links
 Representative Chris Taylor at Wisconsin Legislature (Archived version)
 
 
 
 Follow the Money - Chris Taylor
 2018 2016 2014 2012 2011 campaign contributions

1968 births
Living people
Democratic Party members of the Wisconsin State Assembly
Politicians from Los Angeles
Politicians from Madison, Wisconsin
University of Pennsylvania alumni
University of Wisconsin Law School alumni
Wisconsin lawyers
Women state legislators in Wisconsin
21st-century American politicians
21st-century American women politicians
Lawyers from Madison, Wisconsin
Birmingham High School alumni